Giasuddin Molla is the member of the Legislative Assembly and Minority Affairs Minister from Magrahat Paschim (Vidhan Sabha constituency) in West Bengal.

Career
In 1997, Mamata Banerjee left the Indian National Congress Party in West Bengal and founded the All India Trinamool Congress. Molla also left the Congress Party and joined newly established Trinamool Congress Party. The party won 184 of 294 seats in the 2011 West Bengal Legislative Assembly election. Molla defeated Dr. Abul Hasnat of the Communist Party of India (Marxist) to win his seat. Molla is serving as Minister of State for Minority Affairs.

References

West Bengal MLAs 2011–2016
West Bengal MLAs 2016–2021
People from West Bengal
Living people
1956 births